Isidro Ancheta (October 15, 1882 – 1946) was a Filipino landscape painter. He finished his Elementary, Secondary and Bachelor of Arts Degree (1904) at the Ateneo de Manila. He also studied at the Liceo de Manila, Escuela de Pintura, Escultura y Grabado and the Academia de Dibujo y Pintura run by Teodoro Buenaventura in the early 1900s. He was represented with 8 paintings in the Philippine Section at the St. Louis Exposition of 1904, where his painting titled  A Victim of War received an Honorable Mention. He taught at the Philippine Normal School from 1918 to 1926. Before World War II, his landscapes were found in classrooms all over the Philippines. In 1941 his Tienda del Barrio won Second Honorable Mention in the Filipiniana Category at the National Art Competition sponsored by the University of Santo Tomas.

References

Albano Pilar, Santiago "Pamana:The Jorge B. Vargas Art Collection" Kyodo Printing Co., Quezon City. 1992

1882 births
1946 deaths
Filipino landscape painters
People from San Miguel, Bulacan
Artists from Bulacan
Ateneo de Manila University alumni
20th-century Filipino painters